Troparyovo is a station on the south-western part of the Moscow Metro's  Sokolnicheskaya Line. It opened on 8 December 2014 and served as the line terminus until 18 January 2016. It comes next after Yugo-Zapadnaya, the previous terminus of the line until 2014. Two stations beyond Troparyovo, Rumyantsevo and Salaryevo were opened in 2016.

Name
The station is named after the Troparyovo microdistrict, which, in turn, inherited its name from the village standing here before the expansion of Moscow.

Location
The station is located in the southwestern part of Moscow, at the intersection of Leninsky Avenue and Ruzskaya Street, at the border between Tyoply Stan and Troparyovo-Nikulino districts.

References

Moscow Metro stations
Sokolnicheskaya Line
Railway stations in Russia opened in 2014
Railway stations located underground in Russia